Kainberger is a surname. Notable people with the surname include:

Eduard Kainberger (1911–1974), Austrian footballer
Karl Kainberger (1912–1997), Austrian footballer